The Melody and the Energetic Nature of Volume is the debut studio album by Canadian rock band Evans Blue. It was released on February 21, 2006. The album spawned two singles, "Cold (But I'm Still Here)" and "Over." It has sold more than 200,000 copies, and was at one point #1 on the Billboard Heatseekers Chart.

The album portrays the intricate workings of a relationship and the hardships of breaking off with someone you love. "Possession" is a cover of the Sarah McLachlan song from the album, Fumbling Towards Ecstasy.

A live, acoustic version of this album, entitled Unplugged Melody, with the exception of the Sarah McLachlan cover of "Possession", was included with the purchase of the band's second album, The Pursuit Begins When This Portrayal of Life Ends. It was the first and last album to feature original drummer Darryl Brown.

Track listing

Personnel
Evans Blue
Kevin Matisyn - lead vocals
Parker Lauzon - Rhythm guitar
Vlad Tanaskovic - Lead guitar
Joe Pitter - Bass
Darryl Brown - Drums

Additional musicians
Stuart Cameron - Acoustic guitar on Beg. Lap steel on Beg and Cold (But I'm Still Here).
Kevin Fox - Cello on Over, Possession and Stop and Say You'll Love Me.
Michael Langford - All percussion
Benita Lutz - Backing vocals on Beg.
Tara MacLean - Backing vocals on Beg and Possession.
Sam Taylor - Keyboards on Eclipsed.

Production
Produced by Trevor Kustiak
Engineered by Michael Langford
Mixed by Mark Makoway
Mastered by Joao Carvalho at Joao Carvalho Mastering
Recorded at The Pocket Studios

References

2006 debut albums
Hollywood Records albums
Evans Blue albums